The Mahli are a community in the Indian states of Jharkhand, Odisha and West Bengal. Basketry was main occupation of mahlis. Mahli speak Sadri, Mundari and Santali as their mother tongue rather than Mahli. May be Mahli is a threatened language. Also use Bengali, Hindi and Odia. They are included in list of Scheduled Tribe.

Origin
They are caste who works as palaqulin bearers and bamboo workers. They are divided into five endogamous subdivision: the bansphor Mahli, pahar mahli, Sulunkhi, Tanti and Mahli Munda. Their some septs are Barwar (banayan), Bhuktuar, dumriar (wild fig), gundli (a kind of grain), Induar (eel), Kantiar, Kasriar, Kathargachh (jackfruit tree), Kendriar, Kerketta (a bird), mahukal (a bird), Tirki, Tunduar, Turu,  Lang Chenre, Sanga. Their four septs Hansda, Hemron, Murmu, Saren also found in Santal tribe.

Culture
Their traditional occupation was making households items of bamboo.
They were also making musical instruments such as Mandar, Dhol, Nagara etc.

Their deity is Surjahi (Solar deity). Other deity are Bar Pahari (mountain deity) and Mansa Devi. Their festival are Bangri, Hariyari and Nawakhani etc.

Official classification
In the past, they were treated as an untouchable caste but listed as Scheduled Tribe by the Jharkhand government.

See also
Ghasi Ram Mahli, poet

Further reading

References

External links
Mahali

Scheduled Tribes of Jharkhand
Scheduled Tribes of West Bengal
Scheduled Tribes of India
Social groups of West Bengal
Social groups of Odisha
Scheduled Tribes of Odisha